Ireland and Wales have played each other at rugby union since 1882. A total of 134 matches have been played, with Wales winning 70 matches, Ireland winning 57 matches and seven matches drawn. The two sides have met three times at the Rugby World Cup, with Wales winning two and Ireland winning one of those encounters. Wales won 13–6 in their pool encounter at the inaugural World Cup in 1987. Ireland eliminated Wales at the pool stage during the 1995 World Cup, with a 24–23 victory in 1995. In their third World Cup matchup, Wales beat Ireland 22–10 in the quarterfinals of the 2011 World Cup. In the Six Nations Championship the two sides have faced each other 124 times with Wales winning on 66 occasions, Ireland winning 51 times and seven matches resulting in a draw.

Summary

Overview

Records
Note: Date shown in brackets indicates when the record was or last set.

Results

References

  
Wales national rugby union team matches
Ireland national rugby union team matches
Six Nations Championship
Rugby union rivalries in Ireland
Rugby union rivalries in Wales